The location of the geographical centre of Asia depends on the definition of the borders of Asia, mainly whether remote islands are included to define the extreme points of Asia, and on the method of calculating the final result.

Also on the projection used (radial projection on the plane vs. projection on a geoid), there is no objectively correct way of finding "the centre of Asia". Thus, several places claim to host this hypothetical centre.

There is a monument commemorating that fact in the estate garden.

Current measurements

China
The Geographical Centre of the Asian Continent is the name of a monument indicating the supposed geographical centre of the Asian continent. It is located about 20 km south-west of Ürümqi, Xinjiang, People's Republic of China.

The measurement on which it is based dates to 1992.

Before the completion of the monument, the site was marked by a wooden pole stating "Geographic Centre of Asia" (亚洲地理中心). A village that happened to be located at the site where the monument was to be built was relocated, and the new village is now known as the "Heart of Asia" (亚心).

The site has a tower labelled "Centre of Asia" which represents 48 countries of Asia. The monument was completed in the late 1990s.

Russia
Obelisk "Center of Asia" is the name of a monument indicating the supposed geographical centre of the Asian continent. It is located in Kyzyl, Tyva Republic, Russian Federation.

The monument was completed in 1968.

References

Asia
Monuments and memorials in Russia
Monuments and memorials in China
Geography of Asia
Kyzyl